Alan Tew is a British composer and arranger.

He got his start in the 1950s as the pianist and arranger for the Len Turner Band based in London.

Tew is known as a composer of library music, including the theme tunes for British television programmes, Doctor in the House called "Bond Street Parade", and ...And Mother Makes Three. He also composed all the music for the 1975 series, The Hanged Man, some of which was used as incidental music for The Two Ronnies, The Sweeney, SpongeBob SquarePants, and the 2009 Blaxploitation spoof Black Dynamite. One of the cuts composed for The Hanged Man, entitled "The Big One", would eventually become used as the theme and bumper music for the American television series, The People's Court. "The Big One" would also be used in an episode of the British detective show Van der Valk, as well as the erotic films Barbara Broadcast (1977), The Satisfiers of Alpha Blue (1980), and Malibu High (1979).

Tew also led his own orchestra, The Alan Tew Orchestra, and collaborated with Cat Stevens.

During his career, Tew made a number of orchestral albums including This Is My Scene on Phase 4 Stereo (1967) and The Magnificent Westerns on CBS Records (1969).

References

External links

Living people
British composers
Year of birth missing (living people)